Mark McGowan (born 1967) is an Australian politician.

Mark McGowan is also the name of:

 Mark McGowan (Gaelic footballer) (born 1988), Donegal player
 Mark McGowan (performance artist) (born 1964), British protester